Osek is a municipality and village in Strakonice District in the South Bohemian Region of the Czech Republic. It has about 700 inhabitants.

Administrative parts
Villages of Jemnice, Malá Turná, Petrovice and Rohozná are administrative parts of Osek.

Geography
It lies in the Blatná Uplands.

There are several fish ponds in the municipality, the largest of them are Velký and Bašta. The ponds are connected with the Petrovický Stream.

History

The first written mention of Osek is from 1392, then known as Vosek or Wossek. It was probably founded in the second half of the 14th century. The village began to grow around the lord's court, on which a fortress was probably built before 1414. Osek was acquired by Wenceslaus IV as escheat. He divided it among his minions.

Until the World War I, villages of Osek, Petrovice, Malá Turná and Rohozná were administrative parts of the municipality of Radomyšl, and Jemnice was a sovereign municipality. Shortly before the World War I, the villages separated and created a new municipality. In 1924, Osek was renamed to its current name. In 1961, Jemnice joined the Osek municipality.

References

External links

Villages in Strakonice District